The 1927 Montana State Bobcats football team represented Montana State College (later renamed Montana State University) in the Rocky Mountain Conference (RMC) during the 1927 college football season. In its sixth and final season under head coach G. Ott Romney, the team compiled a 4–4 record (3–1 against RMC opponents), finished third in the conference, and was outscored by a total of 104 to 79.

Schedule

References

Montana State
Montana State Bobcats football seasons
Montana State Bobcats football